The Special Emergency Force ( Qūwāt aṭ-Ṭawāriʾ as-Suʿūdīyah) The S.E.F (Saudi Emergency Force) is a special operations counter-terrorism unit of the Presidency of State Security. Similar units include the FBI Hostage Rescue Team and the French GIGN. The SEF was established in 1972; its main job was to control riots and demonstration alongside assisting other police forces in combating drug trafficking and criminals. After the Grand Mosque seizure in 1979 and the ineffectiveness of the Saudi Arabian National Guard in the Saudi decision of hostages, its role was strengthened. Since 1995, with the first terrorist attacks on Saudi soil in Olaya, Riyadh, and then in 1996 in Al Khobar, the center shifted to combating terrorism, and accordingly it retrained and reprogrammed its forces. 

Now there are 13 centers, controlling 35,000 men, around the Kingdom to combat terrorism.

Notes and references

1972 establishments in Saudi Arabia
Organizations established in 1972
Saudi
Law enforcement in Saudi Arabia